Mandarina is a genus of air-breathing land snail, a terrestrial pulmonate gastropod mollusk in the family Bradybaenidae.

Mandarina have been traditionally placed within Camaenidae. Phylogenic study by Chiba (1999) have found, that Mandarina is closely related to Euhadra (family Bradybaenidae) and that Mandarina have probably evolved from Euhadra.

Distribution 
The genus Mandarina is endemic to Ogasawara Islands.

Description 
The shell is solid. The width of the shell is 15–80 mm.

Species 
Species within the genus Mandarina include:
 Mandarina anijimana
 Mandarina aureola
 Mandarina chichijimana
 Mandarina conus
 Mandarina exoptata
 Mandarina hahajimana
 Mandarina hirasei
 Mandarina luhuana
 Mandarina mandarina
 Mandarina polita
 Mandarina ponderosa
 Mandarina suenoae
 Mandarina trifasciata

Ecology 
Mandarina  live in various habitats including arboreal, semi-arboreal, ground habitats, wet habitats and dry habitats.

References

External links 

 Mandarina: A Microcosm of Biodiversity
 

 
Bradybaenidae
Taxonomy articles created by Polbot